Jan Anderson or Andersson is the name of:

 Jan Anderson (scientist) (1932–2015), New Zealand-born plant scientist active in Australia
 Jan Andersson (politician) (born 1947), Swedish politician of the Social Democratic Workers' Party of Sweden
 Janne Andersson (born 1962), Swedish football coach
 Jan Andersson (footballer, born 1965), Swedish footballer
 Jan Andersson (sailor) (born 1950), Swedish Olympic sailor
 Jan R. Andersson (born 1970), Swedish politician of the Moderate Party
 Jan Anderson (actress) (born 1974), Welsh actress
 Jan Inge Andersson (active 1960), Swedish footballer
 Jan Andersson (speedway rider) (born 1955), Swedish speedway rider
 Jan Andersson (Swedish Air Force officer) (born 1955), Swedish Air Force major general

See also
 Jan Frode Andersen (born 1972), Norwegian tennis player
 Ian Anderson (disambiguation)
 Janet Anderson (disambiguation)